, abbreviated from the Japanese title of  and currently branded in English as , is a Japanese anime television series produced by animation studio OLM for TV Tokyo. It is adapted from the Pokémon video game series published by Nintendo. The series follows the Pokémon trainer and aspiring Pokémon master Ash Ketchum and his adventures with his electric mouse partner Pikachu, and a varying group of friends.

These special episodes includes animated shorts, Mini series, pikachu shorts, pikachu's winter vacation, planetarium specials, spin-off that are not a part of the main Pokémon anime and some special episodes, television specials and prologue to films which aired between the main Pokémon anime.

Animated shorts

Pokémon Ranger: Guardian Signs (2010) 
Pokémon Ranger: Guardian Signs (Japanese: ポケモンレンジャー　光の軌跡 Pokémon Ranger: Traces of Light) is an original short animation of the Pokémon anime based on the game with the same name.

Pokémon Mystery Dungeon (2007-2009) 
The Pokémon Mystery Dungeon series (Japanese: ポケモンのダンジョン Pokémon Mystery Dungeon, also ポケダン Pokédan is an animated shorts of Pokémon anime based on the game with the same name. They were made for explaining parts of the games.

Mini series

Pokémon Origins (2013)

Pokémon Generations (2016)

Pokémon: Twilight Wings (2020)

Pokétoon (2020-2021)

Pokémon Evolutions (2021)

Pokémon: Hisuian Snow (2022)

Pikachu shorts

Pikachu's Winter Vacation 
Pikachu's Winter Vacation is a series composed of several Pikachu shorts that are related to Winter and Christmas. There are three different sets of segments.

Planetarium specials
This is a list of special episodes that were shown exclusively at planetariums and museums in Japan.

Prologue to films

Special episodes from main anime series

Pokémon Diamond and Pearl Special (2011)

Pokémon Black and White Special (2013-2014)

Pokémon XY Special (2014-2016)

Pokémon Journeys Special (2022)

Spin-off

Pokémon Chronicles (2002-2004)

Television specials

Other special episodes

Notes

References

External links
 
 
 
 

Pokémon special episodes
special episodes
Pokémon episodes